Minyo is Korean and Japanese for folk song.
 Min'yō (民謡), a style of Japanese accompanied folk singing
 Minyo (民謠), a style of Korean accompanied folk singing. See: Music of Korea